Vriesea maxoniana is a plant species in the genus Vriesea. This species is native to Bolivia.

References

maxoniana
Flora of Bolivia